Rio Madeira is a container ship owned by A.P. Moller Singapore Pte. Ltd. and operated by Maersk Line AS. Originally owned by Rio Madeira GmbH & Co KG, a subsidiary of Hamburg Süd, she has had two owners and been registered under three flags. 

The vessel is one of three ships of the Rio class built for Hamburg Süd by Daewoo Mangalia Heavy Industries in 2009. The ship sometimes docks for maintenance at the Elbe 17 dry dock in Hamburg which is large enough to accommodate the vessel.

Construction
Rio Madeira had its keel laid down on 22 September 2008. at Daewoo Mangalia Heavy Industries in Mangalia, Romania.

The ship's gross tonnage, a measure of the volume of all its enclosed spaces, is 73,899. Its net tonnage, which measures the volume of the cargo spaces, is 39,673.

The vessel was built with a Doosan Engine Co. Ltd. 8RTA96C main engine, which drives a controllable-pitch propeller. The 8-cylinder engine has a Maximum Continuous Rating of 45,765 kW with 102 revolutions per minute at MCR. The cylinder bore is 960mm. The vessel's steam piping system features an Aalborg CH 8-500 auxiliary boiler, as well as an Aalborg AQ-2 exhaust gas boiler.

Construction of the ship was completed on 10 November 2009.

2022 power failure and subsequent stranding 
The Australian Maritime Safety Authority responded, with an emergency vessel from Newcastle expected to arrive on the afternoon of 22 October.

Notes

Merchant ships
2009 ships